The 1892 United States presidential election in Arkansas took place on November 8, 1892. All contemporary 44 states were part of the 1892 United States presidential election. Arkansas voters chose eight electors to the Electoral College, which selected the president and vice president.

Arkansas was won by the Democratic nominees, former President Grover Cleveland of New York and his running mate Adlai Stevenson I of Illinois. This election illustrated the political movement towards the one-party Jim Crow South – which would cover every county in Arkansas except Unionist Ozark Newton and Searcy. Wealthy white landowners were extremely angry that via the Union Labor Party – which the state Republicans had endorsed in the 1888 and 1890 gubernatorial elections – poor blacks and poor whites might be uniting against them. The Democratic Party thus introduced a poll tax that would weigh extremely heavily upon poor Union Labor supporters and also introduced the secret ballot which would make it more difficult for illiterate blacks and poor whites to cast a vote even if they could pay the poll tax.

Populist Weaver thought he had “magnificent” chances in the impoverished South, and campaigned heavily there. but as it turned out the halving of the electorate meant he could gain very little support. Weaver was not helped by his controversial decision to take a woman – Mary Lease – on his campaigns, as the South thought any political involvement degraded womanhood. Weaver did nonetheless win counties in Alabama, Georgia, Mississippi, North Carolina, and Texas.

Results

Results by county

See also
 United States presidential elections in Arkansas

Notes

References

Arkansas
1892
1892 Arkansas elections